Colin John Curran (born 21 August 1947) is a former football (soccer) defender. He was a member of the Australian 1974 FIFA World Cup squad in West Germany and represented Australia 34 times between 1970 and 1979. He scored Australia's first World Cup goal, an own goal, against East Germany.

References

External links
 

1947 births
Living people
Sportspeople from Newcastle, New South Wales
Australian people of Irish descent
Australian soccer players
Australia international soccer players
Australian expatriate sportspeople in England
National Soccer League (Australia) players
1974 FIFA World Cup players
Newcastle KB United players
Association football defenders